Le Diable à Cinq is a Canadian folk music group from the Outaouais region of Quebec, who play traditional Québécois folk music. Based in the town of Ripon, the group consists of brothers Éloi, Samuel and Félix Sabourin, their cousin André-Michel Dambremont, and their childhood friend Rémi Pagé.

Awards and recognitions 
The band released their first album, Sorti de l'enfer, in 2017, and followed up in 2019 with Debout!, which was a Felix Award nominee for Traditional Album of the Year at the 42nd Felix Awards, a Canadian Folk Music Award nominee for Traditional Album of the Year at the 16th Canadian Folk Music Awards, as well as a nominee in Juno Awards of 2021 in the  Traditional Roots Album of the Year. 

The album Debout! Also won, at the first ADISQ 2020 Gala, the prize of Ma Première Nomination l'ADISQ. This prize is awarded by the votes of the public and is intended for artists nominated for the first time at the ADISQ Gala.

Members 

 Félix Sabourin: vocals, accordion, podorythmie
 Samuel Sabourin: vocals, tenor banjo, fiddle, mandolin
 Éloi Gagnon-Sabourin: vocals, piano
 Rémi Pagé: vocals, fiddle, mandolin, podorythmie
 André-Michel Dambremont: vocals, acoustic guitar, bass guitar

References

External links

Canadian folk music groups
Musical groups from Quebec